The Supervisory and Financial Information Authority  (or ASIF), formerly known as the Financial Intelligence Authority (or AIF) is an institution connected to the Holy See and a canonical and Vatican civil juridic person established by Pope Benedict XVI on 30 December 2010. The first lay person to serve as president of the AIF was René Brülhart.

Overview and history
The authority, according to the new Statute approved by Pope Francis on 15 November 2013, is the competent authority of the Holy See and the Vatican City State in charge for financial intelligence and supervision, including anti money laundering and combating financing of terrorism (AML/CFT) and prudential supervision of the entities carrying out financial activities on a professional basis, as established by articles 2 and 52 of the Vatican Law no. XVIII of 8 October 2013.   

On 5 June 2014, Pope Francis appointed Tommaso Di Ruzza, legal counselor of the Holy See and senior officer in charge of the legal and international matters for the authority since the beginning of its functions in 2011, as the authority's interim Vice Director and also completely replaced the members of the authority's Board.  As of 5 June 2014, the Board members are: Dr. Bianca Maria Farina, managing director of the Italian insurance company Poste Vita; Dr. Marc Odendall, a financial consultant for the philanthropic sector in Switzerland; Joseph Yuvaraj Pillay, Chairman of the Board of Consultors to the President of the Republic of Singapore; and Dr. Juan Zarate, senior adviser at the Center for Strategic and International Studies in Washington, D.C.

In 2013 the AIF became a full member of Egmont Group, an international network of Financial Intelligence Units. In 2019, AIF was excluded from Egmont Group, for failure to guarantee data security, however, it was readmitted shortly afterwards after those concerns have been addressed in an agreement of the AIF and Vatican City's Promoter of Justice.

The AIF has its seat in Palazzo San Carlo, Vatican City, close to Domus Sanctae Marthae. On 5 December 2020, Pope Francis approved an overhaul to the agency which resulted in things such as renaming. The new statutes also redefined the roles of the agency's president and directorate, as well as establishing a new Regulation and Legal Affairs Unit within the organization. This new agency within the ASIF handles all legal issues, including regulation. A Supervision Unit and a Financial Intelligence Unit were created within the organization as well.

Presidents of the Board 
Cardinal Attilio Nicora (2011–2014)
Bishop Giorgio Corbellini (2014 ad interim)
René Brülhart (2014–2019)
Carmelo Barbagallo (since 2019)

Directors 
Francesco De Pasquale (2011–2013)
 Deputy Alfredo Pallini (2011–2012)
René Brülhart (2013–2014)
 Deputy ad interim Tommaso Di Ruzza (2014–2015)
Tommaso Di Ruzza (2015–2020)
Giuseppe Schlitzer (since 2020)

References

External links 
Official website

Government of Vatican City
Vatican City
Financial crime prevention